The women's artistic gymnastics vault final at the 2019 European Games was held at the Minsk Arena on June 30.

Qualification 

Qualification took place on June 27. Sára Péter from Hungary qualified in first, followed by Azerbaijan's Marina Nekrasova and Angelina Melnikova of Russia.

The reserves were:

Medalists

Results 
Oldest and youngest competitors

References 

Gymnastics at the 2019 European Games